La Guerra de Familias (2015) (Spanish for "War of the Families") was a professional wrestling major event, produced by the Mexico based International Wrestling Revolution Group (IWRG) to promote professional wrestling promotion. The event took on March 31, 2013, at "Arena Naucalpan"  in Naucalpan, State of Mexico, IWRG's main venue. The focal point of the event was a four team tag team tournament between four "families".

Production

Background
The Mexican professional wrestling promotion International Wrestling Revolution Group (IWRG; Sometimes referred to as Grupo Internacional Revolución in Spanish) holds several shows over the year to showcase the fact that wrestling is a family tradition in Lucha libre, with a large number of second and third-generation wrestlers following the footsteps of their relatives and becoming wrestlers themselves. Starting in 2012 IWRG has on several occasions held a Guerra de Familias ("War of the Families") tournament, which is a single-elimination tag team tournament where all teams must be related to each other in some way. IWRG's definition of "Family" included by actual blood relationship and storyline family relationships. For the 2015 Guerra de Titanes IWRG booked Los Oficiales in the tournament despite neither member being related to each other in or out of storylines. They also paired up El Hijo de Dos Caras with Súper Nova and never explained what, if any family relationship existed between the two. The Guerra de Familias shows, as well as the majority of the IWRG shows in general are held in "Arena Naucalpan", owned by the promoters of IWRG and their main arena. The 2015 Guerra de Familias show was the third time that IWRG had held an event under that name.

Storylines
The event featured ten professional wrestling matches with different wrestlers involved in pre-existing scripted feuds, plots and storylines. Wrestlers were portrayed as either heels (referred to as rudos in Mexico, those that portray the "bad guys") or faces (técnicos in Mexico, the "good guy" characters) as they followed a series of tension-building events, which culminated in a wrestling match or series of matches. IWRG did not put a specific prize up for the winner of the tournament nor promoting it as the winners would receive a match for the IWRG Intercontinental Tag Team Championship.

Guerra de Familias family relationship

Results

References

External links
IWRG official website

2015 in professional wrestling
2015 in Mexico
2015
July 2015 events in Mexico